This list of mountains and hills of the Rhenish Massif (: "Rhenish Slate Mountains") is a selection of the mountains, hills and foothills of the ranges and landscapes that form the Rhenish Massif − sorted by natural regional main unit groups and heights in metres (m) above sea level (NHN).

See also these lists:– Mountains of Hesse– Mountains and hills of North Rhine-Westphalia– Mountains and hills of Rhineland-Palatinate– Mountains and hills of the Saarland

An explanation of the abbreviations used is given below.

Ardennes 
The Ardennes lie in Belgium, with foothills in France and Luxembourg.
 Baraque de Fraiture (652 m), Province of Luxembourg (B)
 Cairn Roy Albert (589 m), Province of Luxembourg (B)
 Hochtumsknopf (Hüttensknipp; 510 m), Province of Liege (B)
 Croix Scaille (505 m), Province of Namur (B)

Eifel 

The Eifel lies in Germany with foothills in Belgium and Luxembourg.

→ main article: List of mountains and hills of the Eifel
 Hohe Acht (746.9 m), High Eifel (RP)
 Ernstberg (699.8 m), Vulkan Eifel (RP)
 unnamed peak (near Schwarzer Mann; 699.1 m), Schnee Eifel (RP)
 Schwarzer Mann (697.8 m), Schnee Eifel (RP)
 Botrange (694.24 m), High Fens (B)
 Weißer Stein (693 m), North Eifel (NW / B)
 Scharteberg (691.4 m), Vulkan Eifel (RP)
 Nürburg (ca. 678 m), High Eifel (RP)
 Hochkelberg (674.9 m), High Eifel (RP)
 Raßberg (663.8 m), High Eifel (RP)
 Steling (658.3 m), High Fens (NW / B)
 Giescheid (652 m), North Eifel (NW)
 Nerother Kopf (651.7 m), Vulkan Eifel (RP)
 Aremberg (623.8 m), Ahr Hills (RP)
 Hardtkopf (601.5 m), South Eifel (RP)
 Michelsberg (586.1 m), Ahr Hills (NW)
 Eigart (565.5 m), North Eifel (NW)
 Rockeskyller Kopf (554.6 m), Vulkan Eifel (RP)
 Hoher List (549.1 m), Vulkan Eifel (RP)
 Wildbretshügel (525.3 m), North Eifel/Rur Eifel (NW)
 Herkelstein (434.5 m), North Eifel (NW)
 Veitskopf (428.1), Vulkan Eifel (RP)
 Burgberg (400.8), Rur Eifel, North Eifel (NW)
 Sonnenberg (393.3 m), Rur Eifel (NW)
 Calmont (378.4 m), Anterior Eifel (RP)
 Bausenberg (339.8 m), North Eifel (RP)
 Landskrone (271.7 m), Ahr Hills (RP)

High Fens 
The High Fens lie in Belgium with foothills in Germany.
 Botrange (694.24 m), Province of Liege (B)
 Pannensterzkopf (Bovel; ca. 662 m), Province of Liege (B)
 Hühnerhöhe (659.9 m), county of Euskirchen (North Rhine-Westphalia)
 Steling (658.3 m), county of Aachen (North Rhine-Westphalia) / Province of Liege (B)
 Hahnheister (636.3 m), county of Aachen (North Rhine-Westphalia) / Province of Liege (B)
 Hohe Mark (ca. 609 m), Province of Liege (B)

Hunsrück 
The Hunsrück lies in Rhineland-Palatinate with foothills in the Saarland.

 Erbeskopf (816.32 m), Schwarzwälder Hochwald (RP)
 An den zwei Steinen (766.2 m), Idar Forest
 Kahlheid (766.0 m), Idar Forest(RP)
 Ruppelstein (762.7 m), Schwarzwälder Hochwald (RP)
 Sandkopf (757.4 m), Schwarzwälder Hochwald (RP)
 Steingerüttelkopf (756.6 m), Idarwald (RP)
 Idarkopf (745.7 m), Idar Forest(RP)
 Usarkopf (725.4 m), Idar Forest(RP)
 Rösterkopf (708.1 m), Osburger Hochwald (RP)
 Friedrichskopf (707.4 m), Schwarzwälder Hochwald (RP)
 Dollberg (695.4 m), Schwarzwälder Hochwald (RP, SL)
 Teufelskopf (695.0 m), Schwarzwälder Hochwald (RP)
 Schimmelkopf (694.8 m), Schwarzwälder Hochwald (RP, SL)
 Mückenbornberg (692.6), Schwarzwälder Hochwald (RP)
 Hohe Wurzel (668.9 m), Osburger Hochwald (RP)
 Ellerspring (656.8 m), Soonwald – source of the Ellerbach (RP)
 Simmerkopf (653.0 m), Soonwald (RP)
 Ringkopf (650.1 m), Idar Forest(RP)
 Hochsteinchen (648.3 m), Soonwald (RP)
 Schanzerkopf (643.5 m), Soonwald (RP)
 Kandrich (638.6 m), Bingen Forest (RP)
 Wildburghöhe (633.5 m), Soonwald (RP)
 Alteburg (620.5 m), Soonwald (RP)
 Womrather Höhe (599.1 m), Lützelsoon (RP)
 Koppensteiner Höhe (554.9 m), Soonwald (RP)

Kellerwald 

The Kellerwald lies entirely within Hesse.

→ main article: List of mountains and hills of the Kellerwald
 Wüstegarten (675.3 m), county of Waldeck-Frankenberg, Schwalm-Eder-Kreis
 Hohes Lohr (656.7 m), county of Waldeck-Frankenberg
 Große Aschkoppe (639.8 m), county of Waldeck-Frankenberg
 Hunsrück (635.9 m), Schwalm-Eder-Kreis
 Traddelkopf (626.4 m), county of Waldeck-Frankenberg
 Auenberg (610.7 m), county of Waldeck-Frankenberg
 Jeust (ca. 585 m), county of Waldeck-Frankenberg, Schwalm-Eder-Kreis
 Sauklippe (584.4 m), Schwalm-Eder-Kreis
 Talgang (566.1 m), county of Waldeck-Frankenberg
 Homberg (518.5 m), county of Waldeck-Frankenberg
 Peterskopf (506.6 m), county of Waldeck-Frankenberg
 Hundskopf (470.6 m), Schwalm-Eder-Kreis
 Rabenstein (439.3 m), county of Waldeck-Frankenberg
 Keseberg (431.2 m), county of Waldeck-Frankenberg
 Uhrenkopf (ca. 405 m), county of Waldeck-Frankenberg

Süder Uplands 
The Süder Uplands (Süderbergland) comprise inter alia the historic regions of the Sauerland, Upland, Siegerland, Wittgenstein Land, Bergisches Land and parts of the Hessian Hinterland.

Rothaar Mountains 
The subdivisions of the Rothaar is based largely on historic regions. It lies in North Rhine-Westphalia with foothills in Hesse.

→ main article: List of mountains and hills of the Rothaar

Sauerland and Upland 

The following mountains in the highest area of the Rothaar Mountains are those belonging to the historic Upland which lies in the Hessian county of Waldeck-Frankenberg.

→ see also section: Mountains in the article on Upland
 Langenberg (843.2 m), counties of Hochsauerlandkreis (NW) and Waldeck-Frankenberg (HE)
 Hegekopf (842.9 m), county of Waldeck-Frankenberg (HE)
 Kahler Asten (841.9 m), Hochsauerlandkreis, Rothaar Mountains (NW)
 Ettelsberg (837.7 m), county of Waldeck-Frankenberg (HE)
 Clemensberg (837 m), Hochsauerlandkreis (NW)
 Hopperkopf (832.3 m), counties of Hochsauerlandkreis and Waldeck-Frankenberg (NW, HE)
 Mühlenkopf (ca. 815 m), county of Waldeck-Frankenberg (HE)
 Hunau (818.5 m), Hochsauerlandkreis (NW)
 Ziegenhelle (815.9 m), Hochsauerlandkreis (NW)
 Wallershöhe (812.1 m), Hochsauerlandkreis (NW)
 Bremberg (ca. 810 m), Hochsauerlandkreis (NW)
 Hoher Eimberg (806.1 m), counties of Hochsauerlandkreis and Waldeck-Frankenberg (NW, HE)
 Hoppernkopf (805.0 m), counties of Hochsauerlandkreis and Waldeck-Frankenberg (NW, HE)
 Hillekopf (804.9 m), Hochsauerlandkreis (NW)
 Mittelsberg (801.0 m), county of Waldeck-Frankenberg (HE)
 Reetsberg (792.2 m), Hochsauerlandkreis (NW)
 Schlossberg (791.3 m), Hochsauerlandkreis (NW)
 Bollerberg (757.7 m), Hochsauerlandkreis (NW)
 Härdler (756.3 m), county of Olpe (NW)

Wittgenstein Land 
The Wittgenstein Land lies entirely within North Rhine-Westphalia.
 Albrechtsberg (768 m), county of Siegen-Wittgenstein
 Hohe Hessel (742.8 m), county of Siegen-Wittgenstein
 Großer Kopf (740 m), county of Siegen-Wittgenstein
 Kompass (694.1 m), county of Siegen-Wittgenstein
 Ebschloh (686.3 m), county of Siegen-Wittgenstein

Siegerland (historic) 
The historic Siegerland (not to be confused with the natural region of Siegerland) lies entirely within North Rhine-Westphalia:

→ see also section: Hills in the article on Siegerland
 Riemen (677.7 m), county of Siegen-Wittgenstein
 Aukopf (644.9 m), county of Siegen-Wittgenstein
 Giller (653.5 m), county of Siegen-Wittgenstein
 Kindelsberg (618.1 m), county of Siegen-Wittgenstein

Hessians Hinterland 
The Hessian Hinterland lies entirely within Hesse.

 Sackpfeife (673.5 m), counties of Marburg-Biedenkopf and Waldeck-Frankenberg (HE)
 Rimberg (495.1 m), county of Marburg-Biedenkopf

South Sauerland Highland

Saalhausen Hills 
The Saalhausen Hills lie entirely within North Rhine-Westphalia.

→ see also section: Hills in the article on Saalhausen Hills
 Himberg (688.5 m), county of Hochsauerlandkreis (NW)
 Hoher Lehnberg (668.8 m), county of Olpe (NW)
 Jürgensberg (619.2 m), county of Olpe (NW)
 Beerenberg (614.1 m), county of Hochsauerlandkreis (NW)

Ebbe Mountains 
The Ebbe Mountains lies entirely within North Rhine-Westphalia.

→ see also section: Hills in the article on Ebbe Mountains
 Nordhelle (663.3 m), county of Märkischer Kreis
 Waldberg (ca. 638 m), county of Märkischer Kreis
 Homert (538.3 m), county of Märkischer Kreis

Lenne Mountains 
The Lenne Mountains lies entirely within North Rhine-Westphalia.

→ see also section: Hills in the article on Lenne Mountains
 Homert (656.1 m), county of Hochsauerlandkreis
 Schomberg (647.6 m), county of Hochsauerlandkreis
 Großes Sonnenstück (686.8 m), county of Hochsauerlandkreis
 Dümberg (575.5 m), county of Hochsauerlandkreis

Mittelbigge Upland 

 Rammskopf (523.1 m), county of Märkischer Kreis
 Homert (519 m), county of Oberbergischer Kreis
 Horst (514.9 m), county of Märkischer Kreis
 Eulenberg (497.1 m), county of Märkischer Kreis
 Sonnenberg (458.5 m), county of Olpe
 Nordhelle (437.2), county of Märkischer Kreis
 Bracht (429.1 m), county of Olpe
 Rappelsberg (410.7 m), county of Olpe
 Gilberg (360.0 m), county of Olpe

Siegerland (natural region) 
The natural region of Siegerland (not to be confused with the historic Siegerland) lies entirely within North Rhine-Westphalia:

→ see also section: Mountains in the article on Siegerland (natural region)
 Alte Burg (633.0 m), county of Siegen-Wittgenstein, (NW)
 Lipper Nürr (616.9 m), county of Altenkirchen (RP), county of Siegen-Wittgenstein (NW)
 Sanktkopf (ca. 606 m), county of Siegen-Wittgenstein, (NW)
 Die Höh (ca. 598 m), county of Siegen-Wittgenstein (NW)
 Die Burg (594.5 m), county of Siegen-Wittgenstein (NW)
 Hohenseelbachskopf (517.5 m), county of Siegen-Wittgenstein (NW), county of Altenkirchen (RP)
 Eisernhardt (482.3 m), borough of Siegen (NW)

North Sauerland Oberland

Arnsberg Forest 
The Arnsberg Forest lies in the eponymous nature park entirely within North Rhine-Westphalia.

→ see also section: Hills in the article on Arnsberg Forest Nature Park
 Plackweghöhe (actually an unnamed peak; 581.5), county of Hochsauerlandkreis
 second highest hill: unnamed peak (559.5), county of Hochsauerlandkreis
 third highest hill: unnamed peak (557.4), county of Hochsauerlandkreis
 Warsteiner Kopf (556.9 m), county of Hochsauerlandkreis
 Gemeinheitskopf (551.9 m), county of Hochsauerlandkreis
 Niekopf (550.4 m), county of Soest

Bergisches Land on the Upper Agger and Wiehl 
 Unnenberg (505.7 m), county of Oberbergischer Kreis

Taunus 

The Taunus lies in Hesse with foothills in Rhineland-Palatinate.

→ main article: List of mountains and hills of the Taunus
 Großer Feldberg (881.5 m), county of Hochtaunuskreis
 Kleiner Feldberg (825.2 m), Hochtaunuskreis
 Altkönig (798.2 m), Hochtaunuskreis
 Weilsberg (700.7 m), Hochtaunuskreis
 Glaskopf (686.8 m), Hochtaunuskreis
 Pferdskopf (662.6 m), Hochtaunuskreis
 Kalte Herberge (619.3 m), Rheingau-Taunus-Kreis
 Hohe Wurzel (617.9 m), Rheingau-Taunus-Kreis
 Hohe Kanzel (591.8 m), Rheingau-Taunus-Kreis
 Herzberg (591.4 m), Hochtaunuskreis
 Hallgarter Zange (580.5 m), Rheingau-Taunus-Kreis
 Erbacher Kopf (579.8 m), Rheingau-Taunus-Kreis
 Wolfsküppel (545.1 m), Hochtaunuskreis
 Rassel (539.4 m), Wiesbaden
 Kuhbett (525.6 m), county of Limburg-Weilburg
 Steinkopf (518.0 m), Wetteraukreis
 Rossert (515.9 m), Main-Taunus-Kreis
 Atzelberg (506.7 m), Main-Taunus-Kreis
 Großer Lindenkopf (498.7 m), Rheingau-Taunus-Kreis
 Buchwaldskopf (ca. 492 m), Rheingau-Taunus-Kreis
 Goldgrube (492.0 m), Hochtaunuskreis
 Kellerskopf (474.0 m), Wiesbaden
 Suterkopf (461.8 m), county of Limburg-Weilburg
 Staufen (451.0 m), Main-Taunus-Kreis
 Hühnerküppel (369.3 m), county of Limburg-Weilburg

Westerwald (natural region)

Westerwald 
The Westerwald lies within Rhineland-Palatinate with foothills in North Rhine-Westphalia and Hesse.

→ main article: List of mountains and hills of the Westerwald
 Fuchskaute (657.3 m), Westerwaldkreis (RP)
 Stegskopf (654.4 m), county of Altenkirchen (RP)
 Salzburger Kopf (654.2 m), Westerwaldkreis (RP)
 Höllberg (642.8 m), Lahn-Dill-Kreis (HE)
 Auf der Baar (> 621.25 m), Lahn-Dill-Kreis (HE)
 Bartenstein (Barstein; ca. 614 m), Lahn-Dill-Kreis (HE)
 Knoten (605.4 m), Lahn-Dill-Kreis (HE)
 Alarmstange (545.2 m), Westerwaldkreis (RP)
 Köppel (540.2 m), Westerwaldkreis (RP)
 Hohenseelbachskopf (517.5 m), county of Siegen-Wittgenstein (NW), county of Altenkirchen (RP)
 Gräbersberg (513.1 m), Westerwaldkreis (RP)
 Mahlscheid (509.3 m), county of Siegen-Wittgenstein (NW) and county of Altenkirchen (RP)
 Helleberg (491.3 m), Westerwaldkreis (RP)
 Asberg (441.0 m), county of Neuwied (RP)
 Meerberg (Mehrberg; 430.5 m), county of Neuwied (RP)
 Malberg (422.0 m), Westerwaldkreis (RP)
 Minderberg (417.4 m), county of Neuwied (RP)
 Hummelsberg (411 m), county of Neuwied (RP)
 Heidenhäuschen (397.9 m), county of Limburg-Weilburg (HE)
 Hoher Schaden (388.3 m), Rhein-Sieg-Kreis (RP)
 Beulskopf (388.2 m), county of Altenkirchen (RP)
 Himmerich (366.4 m), Rhein-Sieg-Kreis (RP)
 Leyberg (358.8 m), Rhein-Sieg-Kreis (RP)
 Pfahlberg (Pfahlberg; 346.2 m), Westerwaldkreis (RP)

Gladenbach Uplands 

The Gladenbach Upland lies entirely within Hesse.

→ see also section: Hills in the article on Gladenbach Uplands
 Angelburg (609.4 m), Lahn-Dill-Kreis
 Eschenburg (589.0 m), Lahn-Dill-Kreis
 Schwarzenberg (561.2 m), county of Marburg-Biedenkopf
 Daubhaus (551.8 m), county of Marburg-Biedenkopf
 Hünstein (503.7 m), county of Marburg-Biedenkopf
 Dünsberg (497.7 m), county of Gießen
 Hornberg (451.0 m), county of Marburg-Biedenkopf
 Altenberg (442.2 m), Lahn-Dill-Kreis
 Volpertsberg (426.4 m), Lahn-Dill-Kreis

Struth 
 Hemmrain (561 m), Lahn-Dill-Kreis

Abbreviations 
The following abbreviations are used in the table:

German states (Bundesländer; ISO 3166-2):
 HE = Hesse
 NW = North Rhine-Westphalia
 RP = Rhineland-Palatinate
 SL = Saarland

Countries (based on their international vehicle registration codes):
 B = Belgium
 D = Germany (generally not used above)
 F = France (not used above as no mountains are listed yet)
 L = Luxembourg (not used above as no mountains are listed yet)

Rhenish Massif
!